The swimming events of the 1967 Mediterranean Games were held in Tunis, Tunisia. It was a long course (50 metres) event.

Medallists

Men's events

Women's events

Medal table

References
International Mediterranean Games Committee

Mediterranean Games
Sports at the 1967 Mediterranean Games
1967